João de Alpoim (born-14th-century) was a Portuguese nobleman. He served as ambassador of Portugal in Castile.

Biography 

Alpoim was born in Portugal, son of Alvaro de Alpoim, and descendant of Luis de Alpoim, ambassador to England. He was married to Catarina Perestrello, daughter of a noble family.

João de Alpoim was sent by John I of Portugal, on a diplomatic mission to demand from King Henry III of Castile, that he fulfill the provisions of the treaty of May 15, 1393.

References 

14th-century Portuguese people
Portuguese nobility
Portuguese Roman Catholics